Tiram is a town and Village Development Committee in Pyuthan, a Middle Hills district of Rapti Zone, western Nepal.

Tiram is a hill town surrounded by terraced rice fields with a mostly Bahun and Chhetri population.  It is the home of a politically prominent family named Upadhyaya. Tiram is situated on a spur of the Mahabharat Range overlooking Mardi Khola, the largest tributary of the Rapti.

A motorable gravel road from Tribhuwannagar, Dang Deokhuri District passes through the town and descends toward a junction along Mardi Khola with a more important spur road linking the administrative centers of Pyuthan and Rolpa districts to the main east-west Mahendra Highway.

Villages in this VDC

References
 Dhurunga

External links
UN map of VDC boundaries, water features and roads in Pyuthan District

Populated places in Pyuthan District